TED Talks India (originally known as TED Talks India Nayi Soch (Season 1) and also known as TED Talks India Nayi Baat (Season 2)) is an Indian talk show hosted by Shah Rukh Khan, that premiered on Star Plus. The slogan of the show is "Don't kill ideas".

Series overview

Episodes

Season 1
In every episode, there are guest speakers who shares new ideas. Special appearance speakers are Javed Akhtar, Jasmeen Patheja, Karan Johar, Bittu Sahgal, Vikas Khanna, Sundar Pichai, Ekta Kapoor and Shubha Tole, Sarover Zaidi etc.

Season 2 
Season 2 of the show named as TED Talks India Nayi Baat premiered on 2 November 2019 and ended on 24 November 2019 in Star Plus. The last episode titled Ed Tech was host by Karan Johar.

See also 
 TED (conference)

References

External links 
 
 TED Talks India Nayi Soch Streaming on Hotstar

Hindi-language television shows
Indian reality television series
2017 Indian television series debuts
StarPlus original programming
TED (conference)